William Murray Ross (1825–1904) was an entrepreneur best remembered for his failed "Rosstown Railway" in the south-eastern suburbs of Melbourne. The railway was part of a larger "Rosstown Project", which included a sugar beet processing mill and a residential estate. Parts of the rail line easement have been preserved as the Rosstown Railway Heritage Trail.

Ross was born in 1825 in Liverpool, England, He was an insurance broker for the Liverpool, London and Globe Insurance Company, and moved to Melbourne in 1852, working at the company's Collins Street office. In 1857, Ross began buying land for future subdivision and development. Purchasing  in the middle of Caulfield, he went on to buy a further  acres in 1859, and then a massive . By the mid-1860s, he was the primary holder of more than one-fifth of Caulfield, worth about £20,000 

In 1875, he launched his new suburb of Rosstown, running this advertisement in the Argus:

Ross died in 1904. His failed sugar beet mill, which had been known for many years as "Ross's Folly", was demolished in 1908.

References

Further reading
D.F. Jowett & I.G. Weickhardt (1978). Return To Rosstown – Railways, Land Sales and Sugar Beet Ventures in Caulfield. Rosstown Historical Research Group.
Murray, Peter R. & Wells, John C. (1980) Sand, Swamp and Heath – A History Of Caulfield.  City of Caulfield. 
Statement of the claim of W. Murray Ross against the government of Victoria – 1862.

 http://trove.nla.gov.au/people/582530

Businesspeople from Liverpool
Businesspeople from Melbourne
English emigrants to Australia
1904 deaths
1825 births
19th-century English businesspeople
19th-century Australian businesspeople